
Pavlova may refer to:

Persons
Pavlova, the feminine form of Pavlov, a common Russian and Bulgarian family name
Anna Pavlova (1881–1931), Russian ballerina
Anna Pavlova (born 1987), Russian artistic gymnast
Karolina Pavlova, Russian writer

Places
I. P. Pavlova, a metro station in Prague, Czech Republic
Pavlova, Russia, several rural localities in Russia
Pavlová, a village in Slovakia
Pavlova Huť Nature Reserve in the Czech Republic

Other
Pavlova, a meringue-based dessert
Pavlova (alga), a genus of family Pavlovaceae (Haptophyta)
Anna Pavlova (film), a 1983 film about the dancer

See also
Pavlov (disambiguation)
Pavlova Ves, a village in Slovakia